The 1899 Lake Forest football team was an American football team that represented the Lake Forest University in the 1899 college football season.

Schedule

References

Lake Forest
Lake Forest Foresters football seasons
Lake Forest Foresters football